The National Statuary Hall Collection holds statues donated by each of the United States, portraying notable persons in the histories of the respective states. Displayed in the National Statuary Hall and other parts of the United States Capitol in Washington, D.C., the collection includes two statues from each state, except for Virginia which currently has one, making a total of 99.

On July 2, 1864, Congress established the National Statuary Hall: "States [may] provide and furnish statues, in marble or bronze, not exceeding two in number for each State, of deceased persons who have been citizens thereof, and illustrious for their historic renown or for distinguished civic or military services such as each State may deem to be worthy of this national commemoration." The first statue was installed in 1870, and, by 1971, the collection included at least one statue from every state. In 1933, Congress passed House Concurrent Resolution No. 47, which limited each state to only one statue in the Statuary Hall. Others would be distributed throughout the Capitol building. In 2000, Congress amended a law to allow states to replace their statues. Nine statues have since been removed.

The National Statuary Hall Collection comprises 58 statues of bronze and 42 of marble. Several sculptors have created multiple statues for the collection, the most prolific being Charles Henry Niehaus who sculpted eight statues currently and formerly in the collection. The collection includes statues of eleven women, one of them, Mary McLeod Bethune (Florida), the sole African American; two persons of Hispanic descent, Dennis Chávez (New Mexico) and Saint Junípero Serra (California); one Native Hawaiian, Kamehameha I (Hawaii); and six American Indians. Also represented are five members of the Catholic clergy and five physicians or medical scientists. In recent years, many, including former Speaker of the United States House of Representatives Nancy Pelosi, have labeled statues dedicated to Confederate leaders problematic, and called for their removal. Six Confederate figures are currently included in the collection, and three Confederate statues, dedicated to General Robert E. Lee (Virginia), Jabez Lamar Monroe Curry (Alabama), and General Edmund Kirby Smith (Florida), have been removed. Only the states that sent the statues, not Congress nor the Architect of the Capitol, are authorized to remove them.

Statues

Current

Former

See also
United States Senate Vice Presidential Bust Collection

Notes and references

Notes

References

External links

 About the National Statuary Hall Collection – Architect of the Capitol
 National Statuary Hall Collection By Location – Architect of the Capitol

National Statuary Hall Collection
National Statuary Hall Collection